The China women's national under-17 football team represents the People's Republic of China in international football competitions in the FIFA U-17 Women's World Cup and the AFC U-16 Women's Championship, as well as any other under-17 women's international football tournaments. It is governed by the Chinese Football Association.

Fixtures and results
Legend

2017

2018

2019

2022

Players

Current squad
Squad for the 2014 Summer Youth Olympics

1 Xu Huan 
2 Zhang Jiayun
3 Chen Qiaozhu
4 Tu Linli
5 Xie Qiwen
6 Ma Xiaolan
7 Fang Jie
8 Chen Xia
9 Wang Yanwen
10 Zhao Yujie
11 Yan Yingying
12 Wan Wenting
13 Li Qingtong
14 Wu Xi
15 Zhan Ying
16 Tao Zhudan
17 Jin Kun
18 Zheng Jie

Competitive record

FIFA U-17 Women's World Cup record

AFC U-16 Women's Championship record
2005: Runners-up
2007: Fourth place 
2009: Group Stage
2011: Third place
2013: Third place
2015: Third place
2017: Fourth place
2019: Third place

Youth Olympic Games record
2010: Did not qualify
2014: Champion

Honours
Youth Olympic Games
Champion (1): 2014
AFC U-16 Women's Championship
Runners-up (1): 2005

References

External links
Chinese Football Association Official Website 
Team China Official Website 
Profile on AFC 

Asian women's national under-17 association football teams
under
Youth football in China